A forest division is a term used to signify an area containing one or more (usually) demarcated and (usually) protected or resource-managed forests, for administrative purposes. The term was in use in British India, and hence India, Pakistan and Bangladesh use this term for administrative purposes.

In India
In India, the combined forests in a forest circle are completely divided into non-overlapping forest divisions for the purpose of administration and coordination, in an analogous form of dividing the political area of a district into subdivisions. Alignment of the divisions to political boundaries are not necessary, as forests often overlap political boundaries - but one division cannot span more than one state. It generally comprises one or more districts.

A forest division is broken up into one or more forest ranges.

Each division controls the protected areas and managed resources under its jurisdiction, and is presided over by a Deputy Conservator of Forests, appointed from the Indian Forest Service.

References 

Protected areas of India
Forest administration in India
Ministry of Environment, Forest and Climate Change
Types of formally designated forests